Raymond Elzie Hamilton (May 21, 1914 — May 10, 1935) was a member of the notorious Barrow Gang during the early 1930s. By the time he was 20 years old, he had accumulated a prison sentence of 362 years.

First years 
Raymond Hamilton was born May 21, 1914, in a tent on the banks of the Deep Fork River in Oklahoma. Son of John Henry Hamilton -whom abandoned the family when Raymond was 10 - and Sara Alice Bullock. Raymond had five brothers and sisters: Lilly Hamilton, Floyd Hamilton, Lucy Hamilton, Margie Hamilton, and Audrey Hamilton.
Sarah moved the family to West Dallas.
He was raised in Dallas, Texas, where he received his minor public education. Little is known about Hamilton's childhood. He began skipping school at a young age. He used to fence stolen bicycles through future sheriff Smoot Schmid and began comitting petty thefts.

The Barrow Gang
He met Clyde Barrow who lived in the same neighborhood when they were boys, and later joined the "Barrow Gang". Hamilton was involved in the killing of Deputy Sheriff Eugene C. Moore when Moore and Sheriff Charlie Maxwell became suspicious of the men at an outdoor country dance in Stringtown, Oklahoma. Sheriff Maxwell also sustained six gunshot wounds in the exchange, but survived.It was Barrow's and Hamilton's first murder of a police officer. 

The group had drawn suspicion because they were well dressed strangers at a small town dance and some local boys were upset that they were dancing with the local girls. The police 
,assuming the strangers were just bootleggers,originally intervened to prevent a fight. 

Hamilton's presence in the group was often problematic, with Clyde Barrow and other members of the gang commonly referring to his girlfriend Mary O'Dare as "the washerwoman." Mary was the sister of local criminal and early partner of Clyde O'Dell Chambless. When Hamilton was imprisoned at the Eastham prison farm north of Huntsville, Texas, Bonnie and Clyde raided the farm to free him and four other prisoners on January 16, 1934. One of the other escapees, Joe Palmer, mortally wounded guard M. J. Crowson and caused a series of events which led to Texas Prison System chief Lee Simmons to issue a shoot to kill order against Clyde Barrow and Bonnie Parker. Simmons hired ex-Texas Ranger Frank Hamer, who formed a six-man posse in order to execute this order. Hamilton left the Barrow Gang after a fight about O'Dare and was recaptured on April 25, 1934. 

After A quarrel between Bonnie and Clyde,Mary had suggested that Bonnie put something in Clydes drink to knock him out and theyd take his money and leave. Bonnie immeditately told Clyde. Clyde also observed through the rearview mirror Hamilton putting some of their robbery money in his pocket.He was in prison when Clyde Barrow and Bonnie Parker were ambushed and killed by Hamer's posse on May 23, 1934.

Hamilton escaped and went on a crime spree with another former Barrow gang member Ralph Fults. In February 1935 Fults and Hamilton burglarized  a national guard armory in Beaumont Texas,taking two Thompson submachine guns. After stealing a car in Tulsa,Oklahoma February 24 they headed for Texas. They evaded an ambush in McKinney Texas by capturing and disarming the posse.

On March 10,1935 the two gave an interview to Houston reporter Harry McCormick. The two discussed the inhumane conditions of the Texas prison system.  To keep McCormick from facing charges for harboring,they staged it to look like a kidnapping. He was left tied up. Hamilton left his fingerprints as proof of identity.

He was recaptured April 5 1935 in a Fort Worth railyard while posing as a hobo. Hamilton had sent a note to his sister in Dallas, which was intercepted by Dallas deputy Bill Decker. Decker,Schmid and three more deputes drove to Fort Worth and elisted the help of Fort Worth detective Chester Reagan and Tarrant County Deputy sheriff Carl Harmon.

The group canvassed the railyard  and came upon Hamilton around 50 feet north of the East First Street overpass "sprawled on the tracks" with six or seven hobos nearby. When arrested he was wearing dirty overalls and had two .45s on him and a suitcase of new clothing beside him. Decker approached him with gun in hand and said "Host em up Ray, before I cut you in two" Hamilton surrended and was taken to Dallas. The next day over 500 curiousity seekers flooded the courthouse to see the Public Enemy Number One.

Death
Hamilton was executed on May 10, 1935 at the Texas State Penitentiary, Huntsville, Texas, by electric chair. Hamilton walked calmly and firmly to the chair and seated himself with the words "Well, goodbye all." He was preceded to the electric chair by Joe Palmer. Palmer had agreed to go first to give Hamilton time to compose himself. Hamilton was executed eleven days before his twenty first birthday.

Raymond Hamilton never publicly admitted killing anyone, although to his brother, Floyd, he admitted that in the case of the killing of Undersheriff Eugene Moore (August 5, 1932, Stringtown, Oklahoma) he was not so sure. "Clyde and I were both shooting," Raymond told Floyd. "It could have been either one of us. Or both." Raymond Hamilton was convicted of the murder of John Bucher of Hillsboro May 1, 1932, though he had nothing to do with it. The actual killer was Ted Rogers.  Clyde Barrow and Johnny Russell (not to be confused with "Uncle Bud" Russell) were accomplices.

His remains lie in Elmwood Memorial Park Dallas, Dallas County, Texas.

Bibliography 
 UNDERWOOD, SID. Depression Desperado: The Chronicle of Raymond Hamilton. Eakin Press, United States, (1995). 242 pages. .
BLANCHE CALDWELL BARROW and JOHN NEAL PHILLIPS. My Life with Bonnie and Clyde. USA. University of Oklahoma Press; Illustrated edición, (2005). 376 pages. 
 ROBIN COLE-JETT. Lewisville. Arcadia Publishing Library Editions (2011) . 130 pages. .
BURROUGH, BRYAN. Public Enemies: America's Greatest Crime Wave and the Birth of the FBI, 1933-34. Reprint edición. Penguin Books; Media Tie In (2005). 624 pages.

References

Further reading

External links
 

1914 births
1935 deaths
20th-century executions by Texas
20th-century executions of American people
Depression-era gangsters
American people executed for murder
American escapees
Escapees from Texas detention
Inmates of Alcatraz Federal Penitentiary
Barrow Gang
Executed people from Oklahoma
People convicted of murder by Texas
People executed by Texas by electric chair